Mansor Shawkan (Arabic:منصور شوكان; born 19 October 1995) is an Emirati footballer who plays for Masafi as a left back.

External links

References

Emirati footballers
1995 births
Living people
Al Wahda FC players
Dibba FC players
Al Urooba Club players
Al Dhafra FC players
Masafi Club players
UAE First Division League players
UAE Pro League players
Association football fullbacks